Fitampito is a town and commune in Madagascar. It belongs to the district of Ikalamavony, which is a part of Haute Matsiatra Region. The population of the commune was estimated to be approximately 9,546 in 2018.

Only primary schooling is available. Farming and raising livestock provides employment for 44% and 55% of the working population. The most important crop is rice, while other important products are peanuts, beans and cassava. Services provide employment for 1% of the population.

Rivers
The town lies at the Matsiatra river.

References and notes 

Populated places in Haute Matsiatra